The following is a timeline of the history of the city of Baghdad, Iraq.

 2000 BCE – Babylonian city of Baghdadu in existence (approximate date).
 762 CE
Round City construction begins per Abbasid Caliph al-Mansur.
 Al-Khassakiyya mosque built.
 767 – Al-Mansur Mosque built.
 775 – Bab al-Taq (gate) built.
 786 – Harun al-Rashid in power.
 794 – Paper mill in operation.
 799 – Mashhad al-Kazimiyya built.
 812-813 Siege of Baghdad, Fourth Fitna (Islamic Civil War)
 814 – City captured by al-Ma'mun.
 827 – Tomb of Zobeide built.
 836 – Abbasid Caliphate of Al-Mu'tasim relocated from Baghdad to Samarra.
 850 – Book of Ingenious Devices published.
 855 – Funeral of Ahmad ibn Hanbal.
 861 – 11 December: Caliph Al-Mutawakkil assassinated.
 865 – City wall built.
 865-866 Caliphal Civil War, was an armed conflict during the "Anarchy at Samarra" between the rival caliphs al-Musta'in and al-Mu'tazz.
 892 – Abbasid Caliphate of Al-Mu'tamid relocated to Baghdad from Samarra.
 901 – Jami al-Qasr (mosque) built.
 908 – Khulafa Mosque built.
 946 – Battle of Baghdad; Shia Buyids in power.
 993 – Dar al-'Ilm (educational institution) founded.
 1055 – Seljuq Nizam al-Mulk in power.
 1157 - Siege of Baghdad, Abbasid–Seljuq Wars
 1060 – Dar al-Kutub (library) founded.
 1066 – Abu Hanifa Mosque restored.
 1067 – Al-Nizamiyya of Baghdad (college) established.
 1095 – City wall rebuilt.
 1180 – Caliph Al-Nasir in power.
 1193 – Jami' Zumurrud Khatun (mosque) and Turbat Zumurrud Khatun (tomb) built.
 1202 – Minaret of Jami' al-Khaffafin built (approximate date).
 1215 – Tomb of Maruf el-Kerkhi built.
 1221 – Bab al-Talsim (Talisman gate) built.
 1226 - al-Baghdadi compiles  (cookbook).
 1228 – Jami' al-Qumriyya Mosque built.
 1230 – Al-Qasr al-Abbasi fi al-Qal'a built (approximate date).
 1232 – Mustansiriya Madrasah established.
 1252 – Shrine of Abdul-Kadir built.
 1258 – January–February: City destroyed by forces of Mongol Hulagu Khan during the Siege of Baghdad; most of population killed.
 1272 – Marco Polo visits city (approximate date).
 1326 – Ibn Battuta visits city.
 1357 – Al-Madrasah al-Mirjaniyya built.
 1358 – Khan al-Mirjan built.
 1393 – City captured by Timur.
 1401 – City captured by Timur again.
 1405 – Sultan Ahmed Jalayir in power.
 1417 – City taken by Qara Yusuf.
 1468 – Aq Qoyunlu in power.

16th–19th centuries

 1508 - City taken by Persian Ismail I.
 1534
Capture of Baghdad by Ottomans.
 Jami' Abd al-Qadir al-Jaylani built.
 1535 – City becomes capital of the Baghdad Eyalet of the Ottoman Empire.
 1544 – City taken by forces of Suleiman I.
 1578 – Jami' Murad Basha built.
 1601 – Coffeehouse built.
 1602 – City taken by forces of Abbas I of Persia.
 1623 – 23 January: Capture of Baghdad by Safavids.
 1625 - Siege of Baghdad, Ottoman–Safavid Wars
 1638 – Capture of Baghdad by forces of Ottoman Murad IV.
 1682 – Khaseki mosque built.
 1683 – City besieged.
 1780 – Mamluk Sulayman Pasha the Great in power.
 1795 – Jami al-Maydan built.
 1799 – City besieged by Wahhabi-Saudi forces.
 1816 – Mamluk Dawud Pasha in power.
 1823 – Population: 80,000 (estimate).
 1826 – Jami' Haydar Khanah built.
 1830
British East Indian Company in residence (approximate date).
 Plague.
 1831 – Flood, then famine.
 1841 – Lynch Brothers in business.
 1848 – Roman Catholic Archdiocese of Baghdad established.
 1849 – Remnants discovered of quay of Nebuchadrezzar, from Babylonian city of Baghdadu.
 1861 – Istanbul-Baghdad telegraph line installed.
 1865
 Basrah-Baghdad telegraph line installed.
Alliance Israélite boys' school established.
 1869 – Midhat Pasha in power.
 1870
 Municipal council established.
 City walls demolished.
 1871 – Population: 65,000.
 1880 – Turkish camel post begins operating (approximate date).
 1895 – Population: 100,000 (estimate).
 1899 – Alliance Israélite girls' school established.

20th century

1900s–1940s

 1908 – Population: 140,000 (estimate).
 1909 – Cinema built.
 1911 – Ottoman XIII Corps headquartered in Baghdad.
 1912 – Population: 200,000 (estimate).
 1914 – October: Samarra-Baghdad railway begins operating.
 1915
 Istanbul-Baghdad railway begins operating.
Al Rasheed Street laid out.
 Cholera epidemic.
 1917
 March: Fall of Baghdad (1917); British in power.
 Cinema opens.
 1919 – Guardians of Independence organized.
 1920
 City becomes capital of the British Mandate of Iraq.
Iraqi revolt against the British.
 Maktabat al-Salam (library) established.
 1926 – Baghdad Antiquities Museum founded.
 1927 – British Imperial Airways begins operating Cairo-Baghdad-Basrah flights.
 1929 – Al-Maktabatil Aammah (public library) active.
 1931 – Strike.
 1936 – Military coup.
 1940 – Iraqi Music Institute inaugurated.
 1941 - Iraqi coup d'état in Baghdad, World War II
 1941
 May: Anglo-Iraqi War.
 June: Farhud (pogrom against Jews).
 1944 – Baghdad Symphony Orchestra founded.
 1946 – Al-Sarafiya bridge built.
 1947 - Population: 352,137.
 1948
 Uprising.
 Popular Theatre Company and filmmaking Studio of Baghdad formed.
22. 1948 - Jewish exodus from Arab and Muslim countries

1950s–1990s

 1952
 Uprising.
 Modern Theatre Company formed.
 1953 – Baghdad Central Station built.
 1956
Samarra Barrage constructed on the Tigris River near the city.
 May: Government television begins broadcasting.
 Uprising.
 Iraqi Artists Society formed.
 1957
University of Baghdad established.
 Demonstration.
 1958
 14 July: Iraqi coup d'état against king Faisal II at Royal Palace.
 City becomes capital of the Republic of Iraq.
 1959
Revolution City built.
Al-Mabda' newspaper begins publication.
 Unknown Soldier monument erected on Firdos Square.
 1960 – September: OPEC founded at Baghdad Conference (Iran, Iraq, Kuwait, Saudi Arabia, Venezuela).
 1961 – Iraq National Library and Archive established.
 1963
 8–10 February: Iraqi coup d'état.
 Khulafa Central Mosque built.
Al-Mustansiriya University and Al-Rasheed Sport Club established.
 1964 – Al-Yarmouk Teaching Hospital established.
 1965 - Population: 1,490,759 city; 1,657,424 urban agglomeration.
 1966
 Film festival held at Al-Rashid Cinema.
Al-Shaab Stadium and Martyrs' Mosque built.
 1967 – Firqat Ittahaad al-Fannaaneed theatre group formed.
 1968 – National Theatre Company established.
 1970 - Population: 1,984,142 (estimate).
 1971 – Baghdad Zoo opens.
 1975 – Central Post Office built.
 1978 – November: Arab League summit.
 1980
Iran–Iraq War begins.
 Film school of the Institute of Fine Arts established.
 1981 – National Film Center and Saddam Hussein Gymnasium (now Baghdad Gymnasium) built.
 1982
Saddam International Airport, Al Rasheed Hotel, Palestine Meridien Hotel, and Baghdad Conference Palace built.
Ishtar Sheraton Hotel opens.
The Monument to the Unknown Soldier inaugurated.
 1983 – Al-Shaheed Monument built.
 1985
 Baghdad Festival of Arab theatre begins.
 Amanat Al Assima Housing complex and Central Bank of Iraq building constructed.
 1987 - Population: 3,841,268.
 1988 – Saddam University established.
 1989 – Victory Arch erected.
 1991
Gulf War.
 13 February: Amiriyah shelter bombing.
 1993 – 26 June: Missile strikes by United States.
 1994 – Baghdad Tower constructed.

21st century

2000s
 2002 – April: Statue of Saddam Hussein erected in Firdos Square.
 2003
 3–12 April: Battle of Baghdad (2003); United States in power; Green Zone established.
 9 April: Firdos Square statue destruction.
 7 August: Jordanian embassy bombing.
 19 August: Canal Hotel bombing.
 27 October: Bombings.
 2004
 2 March: Ashura bombings.
 29 May: Alaa al-Tamimi becomes mayor.
 25 August: Baghdad International Airport reverts to civilian control.
 12 September: Haifa Street helicopter incident.
 14 September: Bombing.
 2005
 8 August: Municipal coup d'état.
 31 August: 2005 Baghdad bridge stampede.
 Baghdad International Film Festival begins.
 2006
 22 February: Battle of Baghdad (2006–2008)
 7 April: Buratha Mosque bombing.
 1 July: Sadr City bombing.
 9 July: Hay al Jihad massacre.
 23 November: Sadr City bombings.
 2007
 16 January: Mustansiriya University bombings.
 22 January: Bombings.
 3 February: Market bombing.
 14 February: Baghdad Security Plan effected.
 18 February: Bombings.
 5 March: Mutanabbi Street bombed.
 29 March: Bombings.
 April: Adhamiyah neighborhood Wall construction begins.
 26 July: Market bombing.
 1 August: Bombings.
 2008
 Baghdad Metro resumes operation.
 6 March: Bombing.
 17 June: Bombing.
 2009
 1 January: Control of Green Zone transferred from US to Iraq.
 Dismantling of war-time blast walls begins.
 19 August: Bombings.

2010s

 2010
17 August: Bombings.
Baghdad FC Stadium opens.
 2012
 5 January: Bombings.
 27 January: Bombing.
 23 February: 23 February 2012 Iraq attacks.
 4 June: Bombing of Shia office.
 2015 - Air pollution in Baghdad reaches annual mean of 88 PM2.5 and 208 PM10, much higher than recommended.
 2016 - 3 July: Bombing in Karrada.
 2018 - 10 June: Election ballot warehouse catches fire.
 2019
 1 October: Protests erupted in Baghdad in Liberation Square
 7 October: Dozens of protesters were killed and hundreds were injured in Sadr City.
 28 October: Safaa Al Sarai killed 
 14 November: Four people were killed and 62 injured in Baghdad in clashes between security forces and protesters.

2020s
 2020
 3 January: Qasem Soleimani was assassinated by a U.S. drone strike near Baghdad International Airport.
 2021
 21 January: Bombings.
 24 April: Hospital fire.
 25 May: anti-government protests.
 19 July: Bombing.

See also
 History of Baghdad
 List of Abbasid Caliphs
 Neighbourhoods of Baghdad
 List of mosques in Baghdad
 Administrative districts in Baghdad (formed in 2003)
 List of hospitals in Baghdad Governorate
 Timelines of other cities in Iraq: Basra, Mosul, Zakho, Samarra

References

Bibliography

Published in 17th–18th centuries

Published in 19th century
 
 
 
 
 
 
 
 
 
 
 
 
 
 
 
 
  (Bibliography + Index).

Published in 20th century
 
 
 
 
 
 
 
 
 
 
 
 
 
 
 
 Jacob Lassner. The Topography of Baghdad in the Early Middle Ages. Detroit: Wayne University Press, 1970.

Published in 21st century

External links

 
 
 
  (includes photos of Baghdad)
 Europeana. Items related to Baghdad, various dates.

Years in Iraq
 
Baghdad
baghdad
Baghdad